Pareci may refer to:

 Another term for Persian; see Persian (disambiguation)
Pareci people, a name for various Native American tribes in Mato Grosso, Brazil; see list of indigenous peoples of Brazil